Eresus kollari, the ladybird spider, is a spider species in the family Eresidae. It was first described by  Walckenaer in 1802, though it was misidentified. It was later correctly described by Rossi in 1846. It is one of the three species into which Eresus cinnaberinus or Eresus niger has been divided. It is thought to be endangered.

Description 
Their body as most velvet spiders, resemble somewhat those in the jumping spider family. The males have a contrasting color, having a black and red coloration, while the females are completely black. The opisthosoma looks velvety, as their common name would imply.

Colonies 
In colonies, they burrow up to 10 cm in depth. Which is usually covered in a funnel web. Females may carry lens shape egg sack containing up to 100 eggs. Which she’ll carry to a sunny place. The juveniles will stay in the females burrow and feed on her after she dies. They usually form small colonies with up to a couple dozen spiders, but they may reach several hundred or more.

Bite 
Although they are small in size, they are able to bite. A bitten finger may cause pain, and cause fever symptoms, an increase heart rate and a headache, that last a few hours. Though it is not medically significant, and after a few days, it is mostly gone.

Habitat 
They inhabit warm areas, in areas with loose and low vegetation. This spider most often happens in grasslands. Though it has also been found in dry and bright forests. It is found all throughout Europe, except up in the north.

Predators 
The females wasp of the family Pompilidae hunts exclusively on the Eresus genus. These wasps enter a burrow and look for the spider, and they paralyse it with strong venom. The female lays the eggs on the spider, and after a few days, the eggs hatch. These larvae eat and kill the spider.

References

Eresidae
Spiders of Europe
Spiders of Asia
Spiders described in 1846